March is the third month of the year in both the Julian and Gregorian calendars. It is the second of seven months to have a length of 31 days. In the Northern Hemisphere, the meteorological beginning of spring occurs on the first day of March. The March equinox on the 20 or 21 marks the astronomical beginning of spring in the Northern Hemisphere and the beginning of autumn in the Southern Hemisphere, where September is the seasonal equivalent of the Northern Hemisphere's March.

Origin 

The name of March comes from Martius, the first month of the earliest Roman calendar. It was named after Mars, the Roman god of war, and an ancestor of the Roman people through his sons Romulus and Remus. His month Martius was the beginning of the season for warfare, and the festivals held in his honor during the month were mirrored by others in October, when the season for these activities came to a close. Martius remained the first month of the Roman calendar year perhaps as late as 153 BC, and several religious observances in the first half of the month were originally new year's celebrations. Even in late antiquity, Roman mosaics picturing the months sometimes still placed March first.

March 1 began the numbered year in Russia until the end of the 15th century. Great Britain and its colonies continued to use March 25 until 1752, when they finally adopted the Gregorian calendar (the fiscal year in the UK continues to begin on 6 April, initially identical to 25 March in the former Julian calendar). Many other cultures, for example in Iran, or Ethiopia, still celebrate the beginning of the New Year in March.

March is the first month of spring in the Northern Hemisphere (North America, Europe, Asia and part of Africa) and the first month of fall or autumn in the Southern Hemisphere (South America, part of Africa, and Oceania).

Ancient Roman observances celebrated in March include Agonium Martiale, celebrated on March 1, March 14, and March 17,  Matronalia, celebrated on March 1, Junonalia,  celebrated on March 7, Equirria, celebrated on March 14, Mamuralia, celebrated on either March 14 or March 15, Hilaria on March 15 and then through March 22–28, Argei, celebrated on March 16–17, Liberalia and Bacchanalia, celebrated March 17, Quinquatria, celebrated March 19–23, and Tubilustrium, celebrated March 23. These dates do not correspond to the modern Gregorian calendar.

Other names 
In Finnish, the month is called maaliskuu, which is believed to originate from maallinen kuu. The latter means earthy month and may refer to the first appearance of "earth" from under the winter's snow. In Ukrainian, the month is called березень/berezenʹ, meaning birch tree, and březen in Czech.  Historical names for March include the Saxon Lentmonat, named after the March equinox and gradual lengthening of days, and the eventual namesake of Lent. Saxons also called March Rhed-monat or Hreth-monath (deriving from their goddess Rhedam/Hreth), and Angles called it Hyld-monath.

In Slovene, the traditional name is sušec, meaning the month when the earth becomes dry enough so that it is possible to cultivate it. The name was first written in 1466 in the Škofja Loka manuscript. Other names were used too, for example brezen and breznik, "the month of birches". The Turkish word Mart is given after the name of Mars the god.

March symbols 

 
 March's birthstones are aquamarine and bloodstone.  These stones symbolize courage.
 Its birth flower is the daffodil.
 The zodiac signs for the month of March are Pisces until approximately March 20 and Aries from appproximately March 21 onward.

Observances 
This list does not necessarily imply either official status nor general observance.

Month-long 
 In Catholic tradition, March is the Month of Saint Joseph.
 Endometriosis Awareness Month (International observance)
 National Nutrition Month (Canada)
 Season for Nonviolence: January 30 – April 4 (International observance)
 Women's History Month (Australia, United Kingdom, United States)

American 
 Cerebral Palsy Awareness Month
 Irish-American Heritage Month
 Multiple Sclerosis Awareness Month
 Music in our Schools Month
 National Athletic Training Month
 National Bleeding Disorders Awareness Month
 National Celery Month
 National Frozen Food Month
 National Kidney Month
 National Nutrition Month
 National Professional Social Work Month 
 National Reading Awareness Month
 Youth Art Month

Non-Gregorian, 2020 
(All Baha'i, Islamic, and Jewish observances begin at the sundown prior to the date listed, and end at sundown of the date in question unless otherwise noted.)
 List of observances set by the Bahá'í calendar
 List of observances set by the Chinese calendar
 List of observances set by the Hebrew calendar
 List of observances set by the Islamic calendar
 List of observances set by the Solar Hijri calendar

Movable, 2020 
 List of movable Eastern Christian observances
 List of movable Western Christian observances
 National Corndog Day (United States): March 21
 Equal Pay Day (United States): March 31

First Sunday: March 1 
 Children's Day (New Zealand)

First week, March 1 to 7 
 Global Money Week

School day closest to March 2: March 2 
 Read Across America Day

First Monday: March 2 
 Casimir Pulaski Day (United States)

First Tuesday: March 3 
 Grandmother's Day (France)

First Thursday: March 5 
 World Book Day (UK and Ireland)
 World Maths Day

First Friday: March 6 
 Employee Appreciation Day (United States, Canada)

Second Sunday: March 8 
 International Women’s Day
 Daylight saving time begins (United States and Canada)

Week of March 8: March 8–14 
 Women of Aviation Worldwide Week

Monday closest to March 9, unless March 9 falls on a Saturday: March 9 
 Baron Bliss Day (Belize)

Second Monday: March 9 
 Canberra Day (Australia)
 Commonwealth Day (Commonwealth of Nations)

Second Wednesday: March 11 
 Decoration Day (Liberia)
 No Smoking Day (United Kingdom)

Second Thursday: March 11 
 World Kidney Day

Friday of the 13th of month: March 13
 Friday the 13th

Friday of the second full week of March: March 13 
 World Sleep Day

Third week in March: March 15–21 
 National Poison Prevention Week (United States)

Third Monday: March 16 
 Birthday of Benito Juarez (Mexico)

March 19th, unless the 19th is a Sunday, then March 20: March 19 
 Feast of Joseph of Nazareth (Western Christianity)
 Father's Day (Spain, Portugal, Italy, Honduras, and Bolivia)
 Las Fallas, celebrated on the week leading to March 19. (Valencia)
 "Return of the Swallow", annual observance of the swallows' return to Mission San Juan Capistrano in California.

Third Wednesday: March 18 
 National Festival of Trees (Netherlands)

March equinox: March 20 
 Nowruz, The Iranian new year. (Observed Internationally)
 Chunfen (East Asia)
 Dísablót (some Asatru groups)
 Earth Equinox Day
 Equinox of the Gods/New Year (Thelema)
 Higan (Japan)
 International Astrology Day
 Mabon (Southern Hemisphere) (Neo-paganism)
 Ostara (Northern Hemisphere) (Neo-paganism)
 Shunbun no Hi (Japan)
 Sigrblót (The Troth)
 Summer Finding (Asatru Free Assembly)
 Sun-Earth Day (United States)
 Vernal Equinox Day/Kōreisai (Japan)
 World Storytelling Day

Fourth Monday: March 23 
 Labour Day (Christmas Island, Australia)

Fourth Tuesday: March 24 
 American Diabetes Alert Day (United States)

Last Saturday: March 28 
 Earth Hour (International observance)

Last Sunday: March 29 
 European Summer Time begins

Last Monday: March 30 
 Seward's Day (Alaska, United States)

Fixed 
 March 1
 Baba Marta (Bulgaria),
 Beer Day (Iceland)
 Commemoration of Mustafa Barzani's Death (Iraqi Kurdistan)
 Heroes' Day (Paraguay)
 Independence Day (Bosnia and Herzegovina)
 Mărțișor (Romania and Moldavia)
 National Peanut Butter Day (United States)
 National Pig Day (United States)
 Remembrance Day (Marshall Islands)
 Saint David's Day (Wales)
 Samiljeol (South Korea)
 Self-injury Awareness Day (International observance)
 World Civil Defence Day
 March 2
 National Banana Creme Pie Day (United States)
 National Reading Day (United States)
 Omizu-okuri ("Water Carrying") Festival (Obama, Japan)
 Peasant's Day (Burma)
 Texas Independence Day (Texas, United States)
 Victory at Adwa Day (Ethiopia)
 March 3
 Hinamatsuri (Japan)
 Liberation Day (Bulgaria)
 Martyr's Day (Malawi)
 Mother's Day (Georgia)
 National Canadian Bacon Day (United States)
 Sportsmen's Day (Egypt)
 What if Cats & Dogs Had Opposable Thumbs Day
 World Wildlife Day
 March 4
 National Grammar Day (United States)
 St Casimir's Day (Poland and Lithuania)
 March 5
 Custom Chief's Day (Vanuatu)
 Day of Physical Culture and Sport (Azerbaijan)
 Learn from Lei Feng Day (China)
 National Absinthe Day (United States)
 National Cheez Doodle Day (United States)
 St Piran's Day (Cornwall)
 March 6
 European Day of the Righteous
 Foundation Day (Norfolk Island)
 Independence Day (Ghana)
 March 7
 Liberation of Sulaymaniyah (Iraqi Kurdistan)
 National Crown Roast of Pork Day (United States)
 Teacher's Day (Albania)
 March 8
 International Women's Day
 International Women's Collaboration Brew Day
 Mother's Day (primarily Eastern Europe, Russia, and the former Soviet bloc)
 National Peanut Cluster Day (United States)
 National Potato Salad Day (United States)
 March 9
 National Crabmeat Day (United States)
 National Meatball Day (United States)
 Panic Day
 Teachers' Day (Lebanon)
 March 10
 Harriet Tubman Day (United States of America)
 Holocaust Remembrance Day (Bulgaria)
 Hote Matsuri (Shiogama, Japan)
 National Blueberry Popover Day Day (United States)
 National Mario Day (United States)
 National Women and Girls HIV/AIDS Awareness Day (United States)
 Tibetan Uprising Day (Tibetan independence movement)
 March 11
 Day of Restoration of Independence of Lithuania
 Johnny Appleseed Day (United States)
 Moshoeshoe Day (Lesotho)
 Oatmeal Nut Waffles Day (United States)
 March 12
 Arbor Day (China)
 Arbor Day (Taiwan)
 Aztec New Year
 Girl Scout Birthday (United States)
 National Baked Scallops Day  (United States)
 National Day (Mauritius)
 Tree Day (North Macedonia)
 World Day Against Cyber Censorship
 Youth Day (Zambia)
 March 13
 Anniversary of the election of Pope Francis (Vatican City)
 Kasuga Matsuri (Kasuga Grand Shrine, Nara, Japan)
 L. Ron Hubbard's birthday (Scientology)
 Liberation of Duhok City (Iraqi Kurdistan)
 National Coconut Torte Day (United States)
 March 14
 Multiple Sclerosis Awareness Week March 14 to March 20 (United States)
 Pi Day
 White Day (Asia)
 March 15
 Hōnen Matsuri (Japan)
 International Day Against Police Brutality
 J. J. Roberts' Birthday (Liberia)
 National Brutus Day (United States)
 National Day (Hungary)
 True Confessions Day
 World Consumer Rights Day
 World Contact Day
 World Day of Muslim Culture, Peace, Dialogue and Film
 World Speech Day
 Youth Day (Palau)
 March 16
 Day of the Book Smugglers (Lithuania)
 Remembrance day of the Latvian legionnaires (Latvia)
 Halabja Day (Iraqi Kurdistan)
 Lips Appreciation Day
 Saint Urho's Day (Finnish Americans and Finnish Canadians)
 March 17
 Children's Day (Bangladesh)
 Evacuation Day (Massachusetts) (Suffolk County, Massachusetts)
 Saint Patrick's Day (Ireland, Irish diaspora)
 March 18
 Anniversary of the Oil Expropriation (Mexico)
 Flag Day (Aruba)
 Forgive Mom and Dad Day
 Gallipoli Memorial Day (Turkey)
 Men's and Soldiers' Day (Mongolia)
 Teacher's Day (Syria)
 March 19
 Kashubian Unity Day (Poland)
 Minna Canth's Birthday (Finland)
 March 20
 Feast of the Supreme Ritual (Thelema)
 Great American Meatout (United States)
 International Day of Happiness (United Nations)
 Independence Day (Tunisia)
 International Francophonie Day (Organisation internationale de la Francophonie), and its related observance:
 UN French Language Day (United Nations)
 Liberation of Kirkuk City (Iraqi Kurdistan)
 National Native HIV/AIDS Awareness Day (United States)
 World Sparrow Day
 March 21
 Arbor Day (Portugal)
 Birth of Benito Juárez, a Fiestas Patrias (Mexico)
 Harmony Day (Australia)
 Human Rights Day (South Africa)
 Independence Day (Namibia)
 International Colour Day (International observance)
 International Day for the Elimination of Racial Discrimination (International observance)
 International Day of Forests (International observance)
 Mother's Day (most of the Arab world)
 National Tree Planting Day (Lesotho)
 Truant's Day (Poland, Faroe Islands)
 World Down Syndrome Day (International observance)
 World Poetry Day (International observance)
 World Puppetry Day (International observance)
 Youth Day (Tunisia)
 March 22
 As Young As You Feel Day
 Emancipation Day (Puerto Rico)
 World Water Day
 March 23
 Day of the Sea (Bolivia)
 Ministry of Environment and Natural Resources Day (Azerbaijan)
 National Chips and Dip Day (United States)
 Pakistan Day (Pakistan)
 Promised Messiah Day (Ahmadiyya)
 World Meteorological Day
 March 24
 Commonwealth Covenant Day (Northern Mariana Islands, United States)
 Day of Remembrance for Truth and Justice (Argentina)
 Day of National Revolution (Kyrgyzstan)
 International Day for the Right to the Truth Concerning Gross Human Rights Violations and for the Dignity of Victims (United Nations)
 National Tree Planting Day (Uganda)
 Student Day (Scientology)
 World Tuberculosis Day
 March 25
 Anniversary of the Arengo and the Feast of the Militants (San Marino)
 Cultural Workers Day (Russia)
 Empress Menen's Birthday (Rastafari)
 EU Talent Day (European Union)
 Feast of the Annunciation (Christianity), and its related observances:
 Lady Day (United Kingdom) (see Quarter Days)
 International Day of the Unborn Child (international)
 Mother's Day (Slovenia)
 Waffle Day (Sweden)
 Freedom Day (Belarus)
 International Day of Remembrance of the Victims of Slavery and the Transatlantic Slave Trade
 International Day of Solidarity with Detained and Missing Staff Members (United Nations General Assembly)
 Maryland Day (Maryland, United States)
 Revolution Day (Greece)
 Struggle for Human Rights Day (Slovakia)
 Tolkien Reading Day (Tolkien fandom)
 March 26
 Independence Day (Bangladesh)
 Make Up Your Own Holiday Day
 Martyr's Day or Day of Democracy (Mali)
 Prince Kūhiō Day (Hawaii, United States)
 Purple Day (Canada and United States)
 March 27
 Armed Forces Day (Myanmar)
 International whisk(e)y day
 Quirky Country Music Song Titles Day
 World Theatre Day (International)
 March 28
 Commemoration of Sen no Rikyū (Schools of Japanese tea ceremony)
 Serfs Emancipation Day (Tibet)
 Teachers' Day (Czech Republic and Slovakia)
 March 29
 Boganda Day (Central African Republic)
 Commemoration of the 1947 Rebellion (Madagascar)
 Day of the Young Combatant (Chile)
 Youth Day (Taiwan)
 March 30
 Land Day (Palestine)
 National Doctors' Day (United States)
 Spiritual Baptist/Shouter Liberation Day (Trinidad and Tobago)
 World Idli Day
 March 31
 César Chávez Day (United States)
 Culture Day (Public holidays in the Federated States of Micronesia)
 Day of Genocide of Azerbaijanis (Azerbaijan)
 Freedom Day (Malta)
 International Transgender Day of Visibility
 King Nangklao Memorial Day (Thailand)
 National Backup Day (United States)
 National Clams on the Half Shell Day (United States)
 Thomas Mundy Peterson Day (New Jersey, United States)
 Transfer Day (US Virgin Islands)

References

External links 

 Answers article on the seasons

 
03
Mars (mythology)